Leroy Hutson (born June 4, 1945) is an American soul and R&B singer, songwriter, arranger, producer and instrumentalist, best known as former lead singer of R&B vocal group The Impressions.

His music concerns '70s soul, as noted in the June 29, 2006 issue of Rolling Stone magazine. He is the father of producer JR Hutson.

Biography

Early years
As a teenager, Hutson formed the Nu-Tones, a four-man vocal group based in New Jersey. They won several talent shows during his high school years. The other members of the Nu-Tones were Ronald King, Bernard Ransom, Ed Davis, and Irving Jenkins.

In 1968, as part of the duo Sugar & Spice, Lee Hutson and Deborah Rollins recorded for Kapp Records. They recorded several singles with some success. Their single "In Love Forever" ranked the "Best New Record Of The Week" in the local newspaper column "Soul Sauce". Two other singles recorded were "Ah Ha Yeah" and "Dreams".

College years 
Initially attending Howard University in Washington D.C. to study dentistry, Hutson was room-mates with Donny Hathaway who left college early in order to be Curtis Mayfield's musical director, Hutson then chose to switch his college major to music theory and composition. It is through Hathaway that Hutson then came to replace Curtis in The Impressions.

At Howard University, Hutson joined The Mayfield Singers, a group put together on Howard's campus by musician Curtis Mayfield that performed at New York's famed Apollo Theater and Philadelphia's Uptown Theater. The group released one single for Mayfield in 1967.

There, Hutson collaborated with Donny Hathaway on "The Ghetto", giving the late recording star his first hit record in early 1970.

Years with the Impressions 
In 1971, three months out of college, Hutson was asked to replace Curtis Mayfield as the lead singer of The Impressions.  He stayed with them for two-and-a-half years and recorded two albums with the group, before amicably leaving to pursue his own career as a writer, producer, arranger, and musician.

The first Impressions single to feature Hutson as lead vocalist was entitled "Love Me", released on Curtom Records in North America in June 1971.

On August 27, 2013 Hutson, filed a complaint against Young Jeezy and others alleging that Young Jeezy's song "Time" inappropriately incorporated the instrumental portion of The Impressions "Getting it On," which was registered with the United States Copyright Office in 1973.

Solo career 
In 1973 Hutson wrote, produced, arranged and recorded his first solo album, "Love Oh Love", featuring the single "So In Love With You". It was released on Curtom Records.

Between the period of 1973 until 1992 Hutson recorded eight albums and charted with thirteen singles in the U.S. Because of this he has developed a cult following on the soul scene. After "Love Oh Love", Hutson went on to release "The Man", "Hutson", "Feel The Spirit", "Hutson II", "Closer To The Source" and "Unforgettable." Hutson's last 12" the "Share Your Love EP" was released via the UK's Expansion Records.

In 2008, Hutson returned to recording under the name Lee Hutson, issuing an album "Soothe You Groove You" on his own Triumph label and via download. Two years later, in August 2010, Hutson made his comeback to European stages, performing at Suncebeat Festival in Zadar, Croatia, at Vintage at Goodwood Festival and at Indigo2 in London. He was backed by the British group The Third Degree.

As of 2017, Hutson's work is now licensed by British independent record label Acid Jazz Records, who released an Anthology LP featuring his bigger hits such as "I Think I'm Falling In Love", "Lucky Fellow" and "Don't It Make You Feel Good" as well as previously unreleased track "Positive Forces" which featured an instrumental of "All Because Of You" on the B side. They then went on to release another unreleased single, "Now That I Found You".

In February 2018 they re-issued both Hutson and Hutson II and are currently in the process of releasing a four-part online documentary entitled "Leroy Hutson: The Man!", which features contributions from long-time fans of Hutson's such as actor and radio DJ Craig Charles and Acid Jazz founder and managing director Eddie Piller. Piller is said to have based his own music production style on that of Hutson's, and uses the instrumental track "Cool Out"  as the opening track for his current radio show, "Eddie Piller's Eclectic Soul Show".

Work with other artists 
Consistently touring through the late 1970s and 1980s, Hutson also lent his musicality to production work with fellow Curtom artists Linda Clifford, Arnold Blair, and The Natural Four.

As a writer/producer, he has worked for Roberta Flack ("Tryin' Times", "Gone Away"), The Natural Four ("You Bring Out the Best in Me", "Can This Be Real"), Linda Clifford, Voices of East Harlem ("Giving Love"), Arnold Blair ("Trying to Get Next to You"), and Next Movement ("Let's Work It Out"), while more recently one of his own cult singles "Lucky Fellow" was covered by Snowboy on Acid Jazz records.

Television
 The Midnight Special (Episode 20 aired 8 June 1973) - LeRoy Hutson performed "Love Oh Love", guest hosted by Curtis Mayfield
 Soul Train (Episode 32 aired 18 May 1974) – The Spinners / The Independents / LeRoy Hutson
 Soul Train (Episode 37 aired 7 June 1975) – Curtis Mayfield / LeRoy Hutson / Natural Four

Discography

Albums 
 Love Oh Love (1973)
 The Man! (Spring 1974)
 Hutson (July 1975)
 Feel the Spirit (February 1976)
 Hutson II (November 1976)
 Closer to the Source (February 1978)
 Unforgettable (October 1979)
 Paradise (1982)
 Soothe You Groove You (2009)

Compilations 
 There's More Where This Came From (1992)
 The Very Best of LeRoy Hutson (02/25/1997)
 The Best of LeRoy Hutson (UK) (1997)
 More Where That Came From: The Best of LeRoy Hutson, Vol. 2 (03/10/1998)
 Lucky Fellow: The Curtom Anthology 1972-79 (11/14/2000)
 The Best of LeRoy Hutson, Volume 1 (2006)
 Anthology 1972 - 1984 (2017)

Chart history – LeRoy Hutson
Billboard Music Charts (North America) - singles

Billboard Music Charts (North America) - album

Chart history – The Natural Four
 "Can This Be Real" (b/w "Try Love Again")  (#10 R&B, #31 Pop, late 1973)
 "Love That Really Counts"  (#23 R&B, #98 Pop, Spring 1974)
 "You Bring Out the Best in Me" (#20 R&B, Summer 1974)

References

== External links ==

 Official website
 

1945 births
Living people
Musicians from Newark, New Jersey
American soul singers
African-American male songwriters
Record producers from Illinois
Songwriters from New Jersey
Singers from Chicago
American funk musicians
Elektra Records artists
Kapp Records artists
RSO Records artists
Howard University alumni
The Impressions members
Songwriters from New York (state)
Songwriters from Illinois
21st-century African-American male singers
20th-century African-American male singers
Acid Jazz Records artists